Evelyn "Eve" Alice Jane Evans CBE (born 22 March 1910, date of death unknown) was a British librarian who founded libraries in Ghana and elsewhere.

Life
Evans was born in Coventry in 1910. She worked for the local public library service from 1927. In 1933 she had become a fallow of the Library Association and in 1935 she was in Ann Arbor working at the library of the University of Michigan. She returned to Coventry and she was at the Public Library until 1941.

From 1945 she was working in the Gold Coast as the librarian for the British Council. In 1946, John Aglionby, Bishop of Accra donated £1000 of his own money to found the Ghana Library Board. She was promoted to the Gold Coast Library Board in 1949 and served in that capacity for just a year, when it was recognised by statute. She was able to start the first library service and she became the first Chief Librarian in the Gold Coast; and in time she was the first Director of Library Services. She was an advisor to UNESCO and in this capacity she advised the emerging library services in Nigeria, Sierra Leone and Ghana. In 1954, she helped form the West Africa Library Association in Ghana and four years later she was the association's president. The WALA would in time create the Ghana Library Association in 1962. While in Ghana she became close friends with Erica Powell who had an unusual role as the President's private secretary and constant companion. In 1960 her MBE of 1955 was upgraded to a CBE.

In 1961 Evans went on a "world tour" of libraries visiting many in Africa and other emerging countries. In 1964 she published A Tropical Library Service: The Story of Ghana's Libraries. She left her role in the Gold Coast in 1965. Since her arrival in 1945 the Gold Coast had gone from no libraries to over twenty. She had developed a library service for children and she had always planned that the service would in time not be run by the British. In 1967 she was in Libya and Ceylon for UNESCO and she remained in Ceylon until 1970 by which time she had designed the legislation that would create the Ceylon National Library Services Board. In 1975 she was invited back to Ghana to join in the celebrations of the 25th anniversary of the library service she had initiated. The 1950 Ghana Library Board Act had not only created the service but it had committed the government to support it. Ghana was said to have had the first national library service in sub-Saharan Africa which was a model for other countries.

Appraisal
It is conceded that Evans made substantial progress establishing a legal and organisational framework as well as a national library service with a number of libraries aimed at both adults and children. Evans spent five years in Ghana persuading everyone that they needed a "proper library" system but that definition was never defined. Evans assumed that the country needed a library system identical to the one she had seen in Britain. An alternative bottom up approach was proposed and tried by a young Ugandan named William Serwadda in Uganda. He created an alternative approach that he planned would exploit radio to deliver literacy; but he lacked the political backing that Evans enjoyed. Ghana's first President, Kwame Nkrumah, would give speeches supporting Evans, he opened libraries and he wrote an introduction for her 1964 book.

References

1910 births
Year of death missing
People from Coventry
British librarians
British women librarians
University of Michigan people
British expatriates in Ghana